The isoenthalpic-isobaric ensemble (constant enthalpy and constant pressure ensemble) is a statistical mechanical ensemble that maintains constant enthalpy  and constant pressure  applied. It is also called the -ensemble, where the number of particles  is also kept as a constant. It was developed by physicist H. C. Andersen in 1980. The ensemble adds another degree of freedom, which represents the variable volume  of a system to which the coordinates of all particles are relative. The enthalpy  is a conserved quantity.
Using isoenthalpic-isobaric ensemble of Lennard-Jones fluid, it was shown  that the Joule–Thomson coefficient and inversion curve can be computed directly from a single molecular dynamics simulation. A complete vapor-compression refrigeration cycle and a vapor–liquid coexistence curve, as well as a reasonable estimate of the supercritical point can be also simulated from this approach.
NPH simulation can be carried out using GROMACS and LAMMPS.

References 

Statistical ensembles